OurHarvest is an online grocer that offers pick-up and delivery to the New York Metropolitan area. The company was founded in 2014.

Background 
OurHarvest was founded in 2014 by Michael Winik and Scott Reich.

The company sells groceries and other products. OurHarvest resells directly from suppliers, and stores products in refrigerated trucks.

The company has a 2,500-square-foot sorting facility in Hicksville, New York.

See also
 List of online grocers

References

External links

Companies based in New York City
Online food retailers of the United States